Live at the Rotterdam Ahoy is a live album recorded by Deep Purple on 30 October 2000 and released in 2001. It includes most of a concert performed in Rotterdam, the Netherlands during the 2000/2001 "Concerto Tour".  The Concerto for Group and Orchestra itself was performed, but it does not appear on the album due to "legal requirements" (according to the liner notes). Some tracks are solo compositions by members of the band, two are songs originally recorded by guest Ronnie James Dio, and the remainder are a mix of new and old Deep Purple songs.

Track listing

Personnel
 Ian Gillan - lead vocals
 Steve Morse - guitar
 Roger Glover - bass guitar
 Ian Paice - drums
 Jon Lord - keyboards

 Additional personnel
 Ronnie James Dio - vocals (tracks 3, 4, 5 & 6 on disc one, track 4 on disc two)
 Miller Anderson - vocals, guitar
 "The Backstreet Dolls" - backing vocals
 "The Rip Horns" - horn section
 The Romanian Philharmonic Orchestra conducted by Paul Mann

References

2001 live albums
Deep Purple live albums